Nacaduba hermus, the pale four-line blue, is a species of lycaenid butterfly found in Indomalayan realm. The species was first described by Baron Cajetan von Felder in 1860.

Description

Male
The upperside of the male is dark purplish brown. The forewings and hindwings have black anteciliary lines. The hindwing has two black spots that are nearly equal, one in interspace 1 and the other in interspace 2. The spots have a silvery white edge on the outerside. The tail is black tipped with white.

The underside is hoary brown. On the underside of the forewing there are transverse bands of the ground colour defined by very fine white lines as follows:
 a band across middle of cell extended from the subcostal vein to vein 1
 a short band defining and enclosing the discocellulars and a bisinuate discal band extended from veins 1 to 7; succeeding these are an inner and an outer subterminal series of transversely elongate spots somewhat darker than the ground colour and a slender black anteciliary line
 each row of the subterminal series of spots is obscurely bordered inwardly and outwardly with whitish.

The hindwing has transverse bands of the ground colour enclosed and defined as on the forewing by short slender lunular lines of white as follows:
 a subbasal band across cell, another at apex of cell extended from vein 8 to vein 1, and abruptly turned upward and terminating on the dorsal margin;
 a discal band very irregular and sinuate from vein 8 to vein l, then bent upwards to dorsum; beyond these an inner and an outer subterminal series of white lunules, the inner series obscure, of the outer series the lunules in interspaces 1, 2, and 3 very prominent.

Interspace 1 has two minute geminate (paired) black subterminal spots, interspace 2 with one large round black similar spot crowned inwardly with ochraceous and irrorated outwardly with a few metallic blue scales; a very slender terminal white line not extended to the apex and an anteciliary dark line.

Antennae black, shafts minutely ringed with white; head, thorax, and abdomen dark brown; beneath: the palpi fringed with black hairs, thorax fuscous, abdomen dull white.

Female
The female has the upperside dull leaden blue. The forewings and hindwings have anteciliary black lines as in the male, within which on the forewing is an obscure transverse subterminal series of black spots; on the hindwing a very slender terminal white line, a subterminal row of black spots and a postdiscal series of white lunules, the spots decreasing in size and the lunules obsolescent anteriorly. Underside: ground colour paler than the markings, more obscure but identical with those of the male. Antennae, head, thorax and abdomen as in the male but all paler in colour.

Distribution
Nepal, Sikkim; the Western Ghats; Sri Lanka; Assam; Myanmar (Tenasserim); the Andamans.

References

External links

Nacaduba
Butterflies of Asia
Butterflies described in 1860
Taxa named by Baron Cajetan von Felder